Dmitry Vladimirovich Orlov (born 23 July 1991) is a Russian professional ice hockey defenceman for the Boston Bruins of the National Hockey League (NHL).

Orlov previously played for the Washington Capitals, with whom he won the Stanley Cup in 2018 after defeating the Vegas Golden Knights in the finals. He represents Russia in international competition, winning gold medals at the 2011 World Junior Ice Hockey Championships and the 2014 IIHF World Championship.

Early life
Orlov was born on 23 July 1991 in Novokuznetsk, Russia. Growing up, he played against Vladimir Tarasenko as a defenceman with a youth team in Novokuznetsk.

Playing career
Leading up to the 2009 NHL Entry Draft, Orlov was ranked 29th amongst international skaters by International Scouting Services and was described as being "a very hard-nosed player that everyone would love to have on his team." He was also described by the NHL’s European Scouting Service as being "an extremely skilled offensive-minded defenceman with excellent hand-eye coordination." Orlov was eventually drafted in the second round, 55th overall, by the Washington Capitals. Following the draft, Orlov returned to Russia where he posted a breakout campaign for Metallurg Novokuznetsk during the 2010–11 season. Throughout the season, he tallied 12 points and was the top defenceman for Russia at the 2011 World Junior Championships.

Washington Capitals
Once the 2010–11 KHL season concluded, Orlov made his North American professional debut with the Hershey Bears, the American Hockey League (AHL) affiliate of the Capitals. While playing in the Bears' final 19 games of the regular season and six postseason contests, Orlov tallied two goals and 10 points. He made his AHL debut on 26 February 2011 in a 4–3 win over the Albany Devils where he also registered an assist. After recording another assist in his second game with the Bears, the Capitals signed Orlov to a three-year, entry-level contract. Orlov later scored his first North American professional goal in a 3–2 loss to the Worcester Sharks on 9 March 2011.

Once the season concluded, Orlov was invited to participate in the Capitals Rookie Camp in September 2011. While attending both the Capitals Rookie and Development Camps, Orlov was praised for his "high-risk, high-reward style of play." Despite this, he was subsequently re-assigned to the AHL prior to the start of the 2011–12 season. Orlov recorded four goals and nine points through 15 games with the Bears before he earned his first NHL call-up on 20 November 2011. He made his NHL debut the following day against the Phoenix Coyotes where he played 11 minutes and 56 minutes and recorded three hits and one attempted shot on goal. Orlov remained with the Capitals following his debut and scored his first career NHL goal on 15 January 2012 against Cam Ward of the Carolina Hurricanes. He finished the season with three goals and 16 assists for 19 points through 60 games with the Capitals.

As a result of the 2012–13 NHL lockout, Orlov was assigned directly to the Hershey Bears to start the 2012–13 season. While with the Bears, Orlov suffered from two injuries that kept him out of the lineup for a period of time. His first injury came in November while his second came in December and caused him to miss attending the Capitals training camp in January. He ended up playing five games with the Capitals once the season began and tallied one assist.

The 2013–14 season also began slowly for Orlov. Due to a clause in his contract, Orlov was required to be on the Capital's active NHL roster for a total of 30 days or he would be allowed to join the KHL. As such, he was constantly being recalled and returned to the AHL without appearing in a game. He eventually earned a permanent spot in the line-up and remained with the Capitals for 54 games. During this time, he was suspended two games and forfeited $7,076.92 for boarding Brayden Schenn during a game. Following the suspension, the Capitals signed Orlov to a two-year contract extension worth $4 million on 13 March. Orlov finished the season with three goals and 11 points in 54 games with the Capitals before joining Team Russia at the 2014 IIHF World Championship. While playing at the tournament, he suffered a broken wrist which forced him to miss most of the 2014–15 NHL season. In March 2015, Orlov was re-assigned to the Hershey Bears on a conditioning stint after missing 74 games.

After remaining sidelined for nearly a year, Orlov joined the Capitals for their 2015–16 training camp and pre-season. He played with the Capitals through all 82 games while on their third line pairing with either Nate Schmidt or Taylor Chorney. His playing time increased following injuries to Brooks Orpik and John Carlson and he moved up the defensive pairing once Orpik returned. He also accumulated only 26 penalty minutes and was the Capitals nominee for the Bill Masterton Memorial Trophy. Orlov helped the Capitals clinch the President's Trophy as they qualified for the 2016 Stanley Cup playoffs.

Orlov finished the 2016–17 season with career-highs in assists, points, and plus-minus through 82 games. As such, Orlov signed a six-year, $30.6 million contract extension with the Capitals on 30 June 2017.

On 19 January 2022, Orlov was suspended two games and forfeited $51,000.00 for kneeing Winnipeg Jets forward Nikolaj Ehlers during a game.

Boston Bruins
While in his final year under contract with the Capitals in the 2022–23 season and contributing with 19 points in 43 regular season games, Orlov's 14-year tenure within the Capitals ended as he and Garnet Hathaway were traded on 23 February 2023 to the league-leading Boston Bruins in exchange for Craig Smith, a 2023 first-round pick, a 2025 second-round pick and a 2024 third-round pick. Orlov made his debut with the Bruins on 25 February, against the Vancouver Canucks, recorded two assists against the Edmonton Oilers on 27 February, and scored his first two goals as a Bruin in the following night's game against the Calgary Flames. In Orlov's first four games with the Bruins he tallied eight points, including back-to-back three-point games, making him the first Bruin to do so since Zdeno Chára in 2011. Orlov's scoring burst in his first games as a Bruin led him to be named the NHL's First Star of the Week on March 6. On March 11, he became the fastest defenseman to reach ten points in Bruins history, doing so in just seven games with the club.

International play

Orlov represented Russia at the 2010 and 2011 World Junior Championships, getting named to the 2011 Tournament All-Star Team and winning the 2011 gold medal.

Career statistics

Regular season and playoffs

International

Awards and honours

References

External links
 

1991 births
Living people
Boston Bruins players
Hershey Bears players
Kuznetskie Medvedi players
Metallurg Novokuznetsk players
People from Novokuznetsk
Russian expatriate ice hockey people
Russian expatriate sportspeople in the United States
Russian ice hockey defencemen
Sportspeople from Kemerovo Oblast
Stanley Cup champions
Washington Capitals draft picks
Washington Capitals players